Gennady Makhnev (born July 21, 1951) is a Soviet sprint canoer who competed in the early 1980s. At the 1980 Summer Olympics in Moscow, he finished seventh in the K-4 1000 m event.

Makhnev's son, Vadim, has won three sprint canoe medals at the Summer Olympics for Belarus during the 2000s.

References
Sports-Reference.com profile

1951 births
Canoeists at the 1980 Summer Olympics
Living people
Olympic canoeists of the Soviet Union
Soviet male canoeists
Russian male canoeists